The Armenian reforms, also known as the Yeniköy accord, was a reform plan devised by the European powers between 1912 and 1914 that envisaged the creation of two provinces in Ottoman Armenia placed under the supervision of two European inspectors general, who would be appointed to oversee matters related to the Armenian issues. The inspectors general would hold the highest position in the six eastern vilayets (provinces), where the bulk of the Armenian population lived, and would reside at their respective posts in Erzurum and Van. The reform package was signed into law on February 8, 1914, though it was ultimately abolished on December 16, 1914, several weeks after Ottoman entry into World War I.

Background
The Balkan wars had created an opportunity for the revival of new plans to improve the conditions of the Ottoman Armenians.  The French, British and Italians were anxious to limit German influence in the Ottoman Empire, while the Russian government encouraged the Catholicos of Armenia to appeal through the viceroy of the Caucasus to the Ottoman government for intervention in favor of reforms in Armenian-inhabited vilayets. This project was prepared by André Mandelstam, the dragoman at the Russian Embassy in Istanbul, and representatives from the Armenian national assembly. It was introduced and discussed in Constantinople at a meeting of the ambassadors of France, Britain and Italy.

The project suggested the formation of a single province from six vilayets (Erzurum, Van, Bitlis, Diyarbakır, Kharput and Sivas) under either an Ottoman Christian or a European governor general. The governor general was to be appointed by the Powers for the ensuing five years. Germany opposed the project and succeeded in obtaining significant modifications, including splitting the region into two provinces.

Plan
The reform package was signed on February 8, 1914, between the Ottoman Empire (represented by Grand Vezir Said Halim Pasha) and Russia. Louis Constant Westenenk, an administrator for the Dutch East Indies, and Nicolai Hoff, a major in the Norwegian Army, were selected as the first two inspectors. Hoff was in Van when the war broke out, just as Westenenk was preparing to depart for his post in Erzurum.

Historian Margaret Lavinia Anderson states:

References

Further reading

Ottoman period in Armenia
Politics of the Ottoman Empire
Armenian nationalism